Viktor Vladone (1911-2006), was a male Romanian international table tennis player.

He won a silver medal at the 1936 World Table Tennis Championships in the men's team event.

He won nine national titles; singles (1936, 1950 and 1952), doubles with Maretz (1935 and 1936), Fiala (1949), Schapira (1938, 1940) and Lucian (1950) and played for YMCA Bucharest (1928-1931), Romania Cluj-Napoca (1932), Electrica Uzinele Cluj-Napoca (1933-1938), Builder Bucharest (1946 - 1948) and SFIPIA Bucharest (1949 - 1953).

Between 1950 and 1970, he was a coach for Romanian players for the World Championships and the European Championships.

See also
 List of table tennis players
 List of World Table Tennis Championships medalists

References

Romanian male table tennis players
1911 births
2006 deaths
World Table Tennis Championships medalists